German Ugryumov
 Sergey Uzhentsev (ru)
 Dugerby Uzdenov (ru)
 Magomed Uzuev (ru)
 Vladimir Ulyanov (ru)
 Movldi Umarov
 Igor Urazaev (ru)
 Nurdin Usamov (ru)
 Vladimir Usachyov (ru)
 Yuri Usachyov
 Vakhit Usmaev (ru)
 Vladimir Ustinov
 Aleksey Ukhvatov (ru)
 Anton Ushakov (ru)

References 
 

Heroes U